Kevin Joseph Farrell KGCHS (born September 2, 1947) is an American-based, Irish cardinal of the Catholic Church. A former member of the Legion of Christ, he served as the seventh bishop of the Diocese of Dallas, as well as the chancellor of the University of Dallas. On September 1, 2016, Farrell was appointed the prefect of the Dicastery for the Laity, Family and Life. He was created a cardinal on November 19, 2016 by Pope Francis.

Biography

Early life 
Farrell was born on September 2, 1947, in Dublin, Ireland and grew up speaking Irish. He is the second of four sons. His older brother is Brian Farrell, who was appointed secretary of the Pontifical Council for Promoting Christian Unity in the Roman Curia in 2002.

Farrell obtained his Bachelor of Arts degree from the University of Salamanca in Spain.  He then entered the Pontifical Gregorian University in Rome, where he earned a Master of Philosophy degree and Licentiate in Theology. He also attended the Pontifical University of St. Thomas Aquinas, receiving a Master of Theology degree in dogmatic theology (1976) and a Licentiate of Sacred Theology in pastoral theology (1977). He also holds a Master of Business Administration degree from the University of Notre Dame. Notre Dame also granted Farrell an honorary Doctor of Laws degree in 2017.

Priesthood 
Farrell was ordained to the priesthood for the Legionaries of Christ by Cardinal Eduardo Pironio in Rome on December 24, 1978.  After his ordination, Farrell served as a chaplain at the University of Monterrey in Mexico, where he also conducted seminars in bioethics and social ethics. In the early 1980's, Farrell left the Legionaries and was incardinated in the Archdiocese of Washington. In 1984, Farrell was assigned as an associate pastor at St. Peter's Parish in Olney, Maryland. He also served at St. Bartholomew Parish in Bethesda, Maryland, and at St. Thomas the Apostle Parish in Washington, D.C. In 1985, Farrell was appointed director of the archdiocesan Spanish Catholic Center.

Farrell became acting director of Catholic Charities in 1988, and served as secretary of finance for the archdiocese from 1989 to 2001. He was raised by the Vatican to the rank of monsignor in 1995. In 2001, Farrell was named vicar general for the archdiocese and pastor of Annunciation Parish in Washington.

Auxiliary Bishop of Washington 
On December 28, 2001, Pope John Paul II appointed Farrell as an auxiliary bishop of the Archdiocese of Washington with the titular see of Rusuccuru. He was consecrated on February 11, 2002 by Theodore McCarrick and served until 2007 as Washington's moderator of the curia and chief vicar general.

Bishop of Dallas 
Farrell was appointed bishop of the Diocese of Dallas by Pope Benedict XVI on March 6, 2007, replacing Charles Grahmann. Farrell was installed on May 1, 2007.

Within the United States Conference of Catholic Bishops (USCCB), Farrell was a consultant to the Committee on Migration, which oversaw the Migration and Refugee Services department. This department serves and advocates for refugees, asylum seekers, other forced migrants, immigrants and people on the move.

Farrell was the 2009 chair of the USCCB Committee on National Collections, which supports stewardship and coordinates the collections for social justice, evangelization, education and institutional development. His brother Brian Farrell is the secretary of the Pontifical Council for Promoting Christian Unity. Kevin Farrell commented: "I'm younger, but I became bishop first, 12 months earlier. And we still have a little sibling rivalry."

Cardinal 
On August 17, 2016, Pope Francis appointed Farrell prefect of the newly established Dicastery for Laity, Family and Life.

On October 9, 2016, Pope Francis announced he would raise Farrell to the rank of cardinal in a consistory on November 19, 2016. He was created a cardinal-deacon on that day and assigned to San Giuliano Martire Parish in Rome. On June 10, 2017, Pope Francis named Farrell a member of the Administration of the Patrimony of the Apostolic See, and on December 23, 2017, a member of the Pontifical Commission for Vatican City State. In July 2018, the University of Dallas named an administration building after Farrell, a former chancellor. On February 14, 2019, Pope Francis named Farrell as camerlengo of the Holy Roman Church.

In June 2019, Farrell admitted to receiving $29,000 from Bishop Michael J. Bransfield to refurbish his Rome apartment. In 2018, a Vatican investigation revealed that Bransfield had been improperly using funds from the Diocese of Wheeling-Charleston in West Virginia for these gifts and his own personal spending. Farrell returned the money to the diocese and Bransfield was removed from office the next month.

On April 20, 2020, Farrell persuaded Pope Francis to postpone both the 2021 World Meeting of Families and 2022 World Youth Day to June 2022 and August 2023 respectively due to the COVID-19 pandemic.

On September 29, 2020, Pope Francis appointed Farrell as president of the Commission for Confidential Matters, a new office in the Roman Curia.

Controversies

Association with Theodore McCarrick 

After former cardinal Theodore McCarrick was laicized in 2018 for credible allegations of sexual abuse against a minor, further reports of accusations and legal settlements emerged, dating back years. These revelations led to public questions about whether bishops and clerics closely associated with McCarrick, including Farrell, had been aware of these accusations and settlements.

 McCarrick had asked the Vatican to appoint Farrell as auxiliary bishop in Washington. Over the next six years, Farrell served as vicar general there. During this time, he shared a four-bedroom apartment with McCarrick and two priest secretaries.
 Journalist Michael Sean Winters termed McCarrick as Farrell's "mentor in the episcopacy." 
 According to information on Farrell's website, the lion rampant on his coat of arms "honors" McCarrick and the yellow and red coloring at the top right of his coat of arms is also derived from that of McCarrick.

In September 2018, the Italian daily newspaper Il Fatto Quotidiano claimed to have a dossier on Farrell that was part of a 300-page report on financial corruption, gay influences, and blackmail within the Vatican. Il Fatto Quotidiano asserted that the dossier came from the investigation conducted by cardinals Julián Herranz, Salvatore De Giorgi, and Jozef Tomko in response to the 2012 Vatican leaks scandal. The newspaper never released the document.

World Meeting of Families 2018 
In September 2015, the Vatican announced that the World Meeting of Families would be held in Phoenix Park in Dublin, Ireland in 2018. In August 2016, Pope Francis announced that Farrell was the new head of the Dicastery for the Laity, Family and Life. As a result, Farrell took charge of the 2018 WMOF. Farrell said that Pope Francis' visit to Ireland would be "inspirational" and "counter negativity" towards the Irish church. On August 18, 2018, former Irish President Mary McAleese, a critic of the WMOF, said she and her family were not invited to any of the events. Speaking on RTE's The Marian Finucane Show in August 2018, McAleese said of the WMOF: "It's always been essentially a right wing rally... and it was designed for that purpose, to rally people to get them motivated to fight against the tide of same sex marriage, rights for gays, abortion rights, contraceptive rights."

On August 16, 2018, Cardinal Sean O'Malley, who was scheduled to lead a "pioneering session on child safeguarding", pulled out of the WMOV. On August 18, Cardinal Donald Wuerl, due to address the conference, also pulled out. Although organizers claimed to have sold over 500,000 tickets to WMOF, the Office of Public Works in Ireland confirmed that only 152,000 people attended it.

Views

Women and LGBT People
In February 2018, Farrell banned former Irish President Mary McAleese, a supporter of women's ordination and same-sex marriage, from speaking at a Vatican conference on Women in the Catholic Church. McAleese sought an explanation for her exclusion from Pope Francis through a canon law process. Francis has so far failed to engage in this legal process.

On March 18, 2021, Farrell defended a ban by Pope Francis on the blessing of same-sex unions by priests, stating that a blessing was a sacramental action related to marriage, which could only be between a man and a woman.

Gun control
Farrell is a supporter of gun control initiatives and opposes congressional deference to the "gun lobby".

References

External links
 
 
 Diocese of Dallas official website

1947 births
Living people
University of Salamanca alumni
University of Notre Dame alumni
21st-century American cardinals
American expatriates in Spain
American gun control activists
Irish emigrants to the United States
Cardinals created by Pope Francis
Irish expatriate Catholic bishops
Irish expatriates in the United States
Christian clergy from Dublin (city)
People with acquired American citizenship
Pontifical Gregorian University alumni
Pontifical University of Saint Thomas Aquinas alumni
Roman Catholic bishops of Dallas
Roman Catholic Ecclesiastical Province of San Antonio
Religious leaders from Texas
American cardinals